The Palawan peacock-pheasant (Polyplectron napoleonis) is a medium-sized (up to 50 cm long) bird in the family Phasianidae.

It is featured prominently in the culture of the indigenous people of Palawan. The bird is also depicted in the official seal of the city of Puerto Princesa.

Description
The adult male is the most peacock-like member of the genus Polyplectron in appearance. It has an erectile crest and highly iridescent electric blue-violet, metallic green-turquoise dorsal plumage.  Its breast and ventral regions are dark black. The rectrices are wide, flat, and rigid. Their terminal edges are squared. Each tail plume and upper-tail covert is marked with highly iridescent, light reflective, ocelli. The tail is erected and expanded laterally together with the bodies of the birds. The males also raise one wing and lower the other, laterally compressing the body during pair-bonding, courtship displays as well and may also be antipredator adaptation.

The female is slightly smaller than the male. Its contour plumage is cloudy silt in colouration. The mantle and breast are a dark sepia in coloration. The rectrices are essentially similar to those of the male, exhibiting marked adumbrations and stunning ocelli. Throughout, their plumage is earthen and difficult to distinguish from the substrate and branches. While it has similar proportions of the tail to the male, its markings are not as visually arresting. Like the male, the female has a short crest and is whitish on the throat, cheeks and eyebrows.

Chicks are vivid ginger and cinnamon hued with prominent yellow markings. Juveniles of both sexes in the first year closely resemble their mothers. Subadult males in their second year more closely resemble their fathers but the mantle and wing coverts are marked with adumbrations analogous with the ocelli in the contour plumage of other peacock-pheasant species.

Like other peacock-pheasants, Palawan males and some females exhibit multiple spurs on the metatarsus. These are used in anti-predator defense, foraging in leaf litter and contests with other males. The male Palawan excavates slight depressions in which it orients its body during postural display behaviors. The bird vibrates loudly via stridulation of rectrice quills. This communicative signal is both audible and as a form of seismic communication.

Palawan peacock-pheasants are strong fliers. Their flight is swift, direct and sustained.

Distribution and habitat
Endemic to the Philippines, the Palawan peacock-pheasant is found in the humid forests of Palawan Island in the southern part of the Philippine archipelago.

Taxonomy
The Palawan peacock-pheasant, with its unique male plumage and distant range, represents a basal (Early? Pliocene, c.5-4 mya) offshoot of the genus Polyplectron (Kimball et al. 2001). The species is widely accepted to be monotypic, but while some males have white supercillia, giving a "double-barred" or masked appearance, others lack this trait, exhibiting dark faces, taller, denser crests and prominent white cheek spots. The birds with white supercillia are sometimes classified as a distinct subspecies, nehrkornae. The white-cheeked form may inhabit deep forest habitat with low ambient light in rolling terrain whilst the masked form appears to inhabit taller, more open forest on flatter terrain with higher ambient light. This masked form exhibits an abbreviated, more tightly compacted and highly iridescent crest.  Females of the two respective forms exhibit analogous differentiation. The female of the masked form is more prominently patterned and densely crested with paler contour plumage.

It was long known as Polyplectron emphanum, but the name Polyplectron napoleonis was given one year before and takes priority over the newer name (Dickinson 2001).

Behavior and ecology
Peacock-pheasants are highly invertivorous, taking isopods, earwigs, insect larvae, mollusks, centipedes and termites as well as small frogs, drupes, seeds and berries.

They are strictly monogamous, renesting yearly. The female usually lays up to two eggs. Both parents rearing chicks for up to two years. Males act as sentinels of nest sites and are highly pugnacious during the reproductive cycle.

Status and conservation
Due to ongoing habitat loss, small population size and limited range as well as hunting and capture for trade, the Palawan peacock-pheasant is classified as Vulnerable in the IUCN Red List of Threatened Species. It is listed on Appendix I of CITES.

Gallery

References

Footnotes

Works cited 
Dickinson, E. C. (2001): The correct scientific name of the Palawan Peacock-Pheasant is Polyplectron napoleonis (Lesson, 1831). Bull. B. O. C. 121(4): 266–272.
Kimball, Rebecca T.; Braun, Edward L.; Ligon, J. David; Lucchini, Vittorio & Randi, Ettore (2001): A molecular phylogeny of the peacock-pheasants (Galliformes: Polyplectron spp.) indicates loss and reduction of ornamental traits and display behaviour. Biol. J. Linn. Soc. 73(2): 187–198. HTML abstract
Lesson, René-Primevère (1831): Traite d'Ornithologie 7:487; 8: 650.
Temminck, Coenraad Jacob (1832): Nouveau Recueil de Planches coloriées d'Oiseaux 88 plate 540.

External links 

 ARKive - images and movies of the Palawan peacock-pheasant (Polyplectron napoleonis)
 BirdLife Species Factsheet
 Red Data Book

Palawan peacock-pheasant
Birds of Palawan
Birds described in 1831
Taxa named by René Lesson